Zabawka may refer to:

Zabawka, Podlaskie Voivodeship
Zabawka (film)  - a 1933 film